The Bära is a river in Baden-Württemberg, Germany. The Bära is a tributary of the Danube, and originates at the confluence of the Obere Bära (Upper Bära) and the Untere Bära (Lower Bära).

Obere and Untere Bära join to form the Bära in the Galgenwiesen ("gallows meadow"), about four kilometers above the resort of Bärenthal. Passing through Bärenthal at last it flows into Fridingen and there, near the town mill, it flows last of all in a southwesterly direction into the upper Danube, approximately at the entrance to the Fridingen Danube Bend.

See also 
List of rivers of Baden-Württemberg

References

External links 

Rivers of Baden-Württemberg
Rivers of Germany